is a passenger railway station located in the city of Kameoka, Kyoto Prefecture, Japan, operated by West Japan Railway Company (JR West).

Lines

Station layout
The station consists of two ground-level island platforms connected by an elevated station building. The station has a Midori no Madoguchi staffed ticket office.  Entrances to the station are on the south and north side of the station.

Platforms

History
With the privatization of the Japan National Railways (JNR) on 1 April 1987, the station came under the aegis of the West Japan Railway Company. The current station building was completed in 2008.

Station numbering was introduced in March 2018 with Kameoka being assigned station number JR-E11.

Passenger statistics
In fiscal 2019, the station was used by an average of 8749 passengers daily.

Surrounding area
 Kameoka City Hall
 Kameoka City Library
 Kyoto Prefectural Kameoka High School
 Kameoka City Kameoka Junior High School
 Kameoka Municipal Kameoka Elementary School
 Kameoka Municipal Josai Elementary School
 Sanga Stadium by Kyocera

See also
List of railway stations in Japan

References

External links

 Station Official Site

Railway stations in Kyoto Prefecture
Sanin Main Line
Railway stations in Japan opened in 1899
Kameoka, Kyoto